Zhangjiakou Ningyuan Airport , or Zhangjiakou Air Base, is a dual-use military and public airport serving the city of Zhangjiakou in Hebei Province, China.  It is located 9 kilometers southeast of the city center. Construction to convert the air base to a dual-use airport began in May 2010 at an estimated cost of 450 million yuan. The airport was opened on 16 June 2013.

Facilities
The airport has a runway that is 2,500 meters long and 45 meters wide (class 4C). It is capable of handling 200,000 passengers and 900 tons of cargo annually.

Airlines and destinations

See also
List of airports in China
List of the busiest airports in China
List of People's Liberation Army Air Force airbases

References

Airports in Hebei
Chinese Air Force bases
Airports established in 2013
2013 establishments in China